Josef Wilhelm Freiherr von Löschner or in Czech Josef Vilém z Löschneru (May 7, 1809 – April 19, 1888) was an Austrian physician born in Kaaden, Bohemia. He studied at Gymnasium Kadaň.

In 1834 he received his medical doctorate at Prague, and several years later he obtained his habilitation for balneology (1841). Later on, he became a professor at the University of Prague, where in 1862-63 he served as university rector. In 1862 he was appointed Landesmedizinalrat, and in 1865 became Hofrat (councilor) and a personal physician to Franz Joseph I of Austria. A foundation arranged by Löschner resulted in the creation of the Franz Joseph Kinderhospital in Prague.

Löschner is remembered for his work in the field of balneology. He advocated the curative properties of health spas, and wrote numerous articles promoting the spas of Bohemia. These publications were instrumental in making Bohemian spas a popular tourist destination, particularly the resorts at Karlsbad and Bílina, which were regularly visited by members of European royalty.

Written works 
 Der Gießhübler Sauerbrunn, 1846 - Giebhubler-Sauerbrunn.
 Die Versendung der Karlsbader Mineralquellen, 1847 - The dispatch of the Karlsbad mineral springs.
 Das Saidschitzer Bitterwasser, 1853 - Bitter waters of Saidschitz.
 Der Sauerbrunnen zu Bilin, 1859 - Bílinská kyselka healing mineral water Bílina.
 Johannisbad im böhmischen Riesengebirge, 1859 - Johannisbad in the Riesengebirge Mountains.
 Beiträge zu Balneologie aus den Kurorten Böhmens, 1862 - Contributions to balneology from the health resorts in Bohemia.
 Balneologische Skizze von Tetschen-Bodenbach, 1862 - Balneological sketch of Tetschen Bodenbach.
 Die Eisenwässer von Königswart, 1865 - The ice-cold waters of Königswart), 1865
 Teplitz und die benachbarten Kurorte, 1867 - Teplitz and neighbouring health resorts.

References 
 This article is based on a translation of an equivalent article at the German Wikipedia, references listed as:
  Austrian Biographical Encyclopaedia 1815-1950 (ÖBL). Volume 5 Austrian Academy of Sciences, Vienna 1972; -  page 279, and  page 280.

1809 births
1888 deaths
19th-century Austrian physicians
Balneotherapy
Academic staff of Charles University
Charles University alumni
Bohemian nobility
Barons of Austria
German Bohemian people
Austrian people of German Bohemian descent
People from Kadaň
Physicians from Prague